Cambridge Town may refer to:

 Cambridge Town, Essex, a part of the town of Shoeburyness, England
 Town of Cambridge, Western Australia, Australia
 Camberley, town in Surrey originally named Cambridge Town
 Cambridge City F.C., football club in Cambridge known as Cambridge Town F.C. before 1951

See also
 Cambridge (disambiguation)